Probstzella is a municipality in the district Saalfeld-Rudolstadt, in Thuringia, Germany.

History
Between 1945 and 1990 Probstzella station served as East German inner German border crossing for rail transport. The crossing was open for trains travelling between the Soviet Zone of occupation in Germany (till 1949, thereafter the East German Democratic Republic) or West Berlin on the one hand, and the American zone of occupation (till 1949), thereafter the West German Federal Republic of Germany, on the other. The traffic was subject to the Interzonal traffic regulations, that between West Germany and West Berlin followed the special regulations of the Transit Agreement (1972).

Famous people
Ludwig Greiner, was born in the village Lichtentanne (today part of Probstzella), identified Gerlachovský Peak as the summit of the Carpathians

References

Municipalities in Thuringia
Inner German border
Saalfeld-Rudolstadt